Shraddha Dangar (born 15 October 1994) is an Indian actress and model from Gujarat, India. She is known for Hellaro (2019), machhachu (2018) and Pappa Tamne Nahi Samjaay (2017) and Luv Ni Love Storys (2020).

Career
Shraddha made her debut in the movie Pappa Tamney Nai Samjaay (2017) starring Bhavya Gandhi, Manoj Joshi and Ketki Dave. She was also seen in a musical comedy film Tari Maate Once More (2018). In 2019, she was part of two remarkable films that include Machchhu, based on the true events of Machchhu Dam disaster and Hellaro, which is a Gujarati period drama film.

Her film, Hellaro won the National Film Award for Best Feature Film at the 66th National Film Awards and she has earned Special Jury Award for her performance. The film has been theatrically released in India on 8 November 2019 to positive reviews and her acting is appreciated by the audiences.
 
She has also featured in some TVC advertisements for brands like Eandevour etc.

Filmography

Television
 Bakula Bua Ka Bhoot as Manidadi

Films

Web series
Dangar has acted in the following web series:

Music videos

Accolades

References

External links
 
 
 

Gujarati people
1994 births
Living people
Actresses in Gujarati cinema
People from Rajkot